is a private university in Mifune, Kumamoto, Japan. The school was first established in 1972 as a junior college and became a four-year college in 2001.

External links
 Official website 

Educational institutions established in 1972
Private universities and colleges in Japan
Universities and colleges in Kumamoto Prefecture